The  is a railway line in Japan operated by West Japan Railway Company (JR West).

Stations

Rolling stock
 KiHa 120 series DMUs

History

With the privatization of Japanese National Railways (JNR) on 1 April 1987, the line was transferred to the control of JR West.

See also
 List of railway lines in Japan

References

Rail transport in Shimane Prefecture
Rail transport in Hiroshima Prefecture
Lines of West Japan Railway Company
Railway lines opened in 1932
1067 mm gauge railways in Japan
Railways with Zig Zags